Trypocolaspis is a genus of Australian leaf beetles in the subfamily Eumolpinae first described by Arthur Mills Lea in 1915.

Species
Species include:

 Trypocolaspis biimpressa Lea, 1915
 Trypocolaspis multicarinata Lea, 1915
 Trypocolaspis multiseriata Lea, 1915
 Trypocolaspis obscuripes Lea, 1915
 Trypocolaspis punctatostriata Lea, 1915
 Trypocolaspis sinuata Lea, 1915
 Trypocolaspis ventralis Lea, 1915

References

External links
 Genus Trypocolaspis Lea, 1915 at Australian Faunal Directory

Eumolpinae
Chrysomelidae genera
Beetles of Australia
Taxa named by Arthur Mills Lea